Somatidia tenebrica is a species of beetle in the family Cerambycidae. It was described by Broun in 1893.

References

tenebrica
Beetles described in 1893